Interstate 87 (I-87) is a  north–south Interstate Highway located entirely within the US state of New York. It is most of the main highway between New York City and Montreal. The highway begins at exit 47 off I-278 in the New York City borough of the Bronx, just north of the Robert F. Kennedy Bridge and Grand Central Parkway. From there, the route runs northward through the Hudson Valley, the Capital District, and the easternmost part of the North Country to the Canadian border in the town of Champlain. At its north end, I-87 continues into Quebec as Autoroute 15 (A-15). I-87 connects with several regionally important roads: I-95 in New York City, New York State Route 17 (NY 17; future I-86) near Harriman, I-84 near Newburgh, and I-90 in Albany. The highway is not contiguous with I-87 in North Carolina.

I-87 was assigned in 1957 as part of the establishment of the Interstate Highway System. The portion of I-87 south of Albany follows two controlled-access highways that predate the Interstate Highway designation, the Major Deegan Expressway (locally known as the Deegan) in New York City and the tolled New York State Thruway from the New York City line to Albany. North of Albany, I-87 follows the Adirondack Northway, a highway built in stages between 1957 and 1967. Early proposals for I-87 called for the route to take a more easterly course through the Hudson Valley and extreme southwestern Connecticut between New York City and Newburgh. These plans were scrapped in 1970 when I-87 was realigned onto the Thruway between Westchester County and Newburgh.

Route description
I-87 makes up most of the major strategic corridor between New York City, the largest metropolitan area in the US, and Montreal, the second largest metropolitan area in Canada (formerly the largest metropolitan in Canada). The New York State Department of Transportation (NYSDOT) considers the route important for commerce, as it connects with numerous highways in the region and serves approximately 80 million people along the Mid-Atlantic states, New England, and Quebec. Motorists can connect to multiple highways on I-87 to travel farther south along I-95 through the Mid-Atlantic states, or through numerous other highways to travel farther east into New England.

The highest traffic counts on the highway are between the Bruckner Expressway and the George Washington Bridge in New York City. The remainder of the route in New York City and its suburbs (mainly Suffern and south) also has particularly high traffic counts, especially over the Tappan Zee Bridge as it goes over the Hudson River. Upstate, the most used sections are in Albany and Saratoga, as those are the most populated areas in the north. The least used sections of I-87 are the portions of the Thruway between Newburgh and the Berkshire Connector, followed by the Northway through the northern parts of Adirondack Park.

South of Albany

Major Deegan Expressway

I-87 and the Major Deegan Expressway begins in the Bronx at the northern approach to the Robert F. Kennedy Bridge, where it connects to the Bruckner Expressway (I-278) at a directional T interchange. The route heads west from the interchange, paralleling loosely with the Harlem River through Mott Haven. After , the highway makes a turn to the north, mirroring a change in the nearby river's course. It passes by Yankee Stadium on its way to Highbridge, where the Deegan connects to the Cross Bronx Expressway (I-95 and US Route 1 [US 1]) at the eastern approach to the Alexander Hamilton Bridge. The Deegan remains in close proximity to the Harlem River until the waterway turns westward at Kingsbridge to form the northern edge of Manhattan.

North of Kingsbridge, the expressway follows a generally northeasterly alignment, passing through the center of Van Cortlandt Park as it connects to Mosholu Parkway and Jerome Avenue. Mosholu Parkway also links the Deegan to the Henry Hudson and Saw Mill River parkways, which run parallel to the Major Deegan Expressway through the western Bronx and Manhattan. Past Jerome Avenue, the freeway gains a pair of service roads and heads north to the New York City line, where it becomes the New York State Thruway as it passes into Westchester County. The last northbound exit on the Deegan connects to McLean Avenue, located north of the city line in Yonkers. The exit 14 ramp leads to the service road in the Bronx but does not meet McLean Avenue until it crosses the county line. Southbound access to McLean Avenue is provided by Thruway exit 1 in Yonkers.

New York State Thruway

At the New York City–Yonkers border, I-87 changes to the New York State Thruway as the mainline proceeds northward through Yonkers and southern Westchester County. It connects with Central Park Avenue (NY 100) at exit 1, the first of 12 exits within the county. The first few exits serve various local streets, with exit 2 providing access to Yonkers Raceway & Empire City Casino and exit 3 serving the Cross County Shopping Center. At exit 4, I-87 connects to the Cross County Parkway, an east–west parkway providing access to the Saw Mill River, Bronx River, and Hutchinson River parkways. The north–south parkways and I-95 run parallel to the Thruway through Southern Westchester. The Bronx River parkway leaves to the northeast midway through Yonkers, while the Saw Mill and Sprain Brook parkways follow the Thruway out of the city.

All three highways take generally parallel tracks to Elmsford, where I-87 directly intersects the Saw Mill River Parkway at exit 7A. Not far to the north is exit 8, a semi-directional T interchange with I-287 (the Cross-Westchester Expressway). I-287 joins the Thruway here, following I-87 west across the Hudson River into Rockland County on the Tappan Zee Bridge. I-87 and I-287 remain overlapped for  through the densely populated southern portion of Rockland County, meeting the Palisades Interstate Parkway and the Garden State Parkway Connector, with the latter providing access to the Garden State Parkway in New Jersey. The Thruway continues generally westward to Suffern, where I-87 and I-287 split at a large semi-directional T interchange (exit 15) only about a half mile from the New Jersey border. At this point, I-287 heads south into New Jersey while I-87 and the Thruway turn northward into the valley of the Ramapo River.

The Thruway continues north as a six-lane tollway through the river valley toward Harriman, where it encounters the Woodbury toll barrier, the southeastern end of the mainline's major closed ticket system. The barrier is located on the mainline within exit 16 (NY 17), a trumpet interchange. Along with the mainline barrier in Harriman, an electronic toll gantry exists on the exit 16 ramp midway between the Thruway and NY 17 exit 131 (NY 32). Now a completely tolled highway, the Thruway heads northward as it narrows to four lanes, roughly paralleling the Hudson River to the river's west as it serves the city of Newburgh, village of New Paltz, and city of Kingston, indirectly connecting to the short I-587 in the latter.

Past Kingston, the highway runs closer to the river as it parallels US 9W through the towns of Saugerties, Catskill, Coxsackie, and Ravena. Just north of Ravena, the Thruway meets the west end of the Berkshire Connector, a spur linking the Thruway mainline to the Massachusetts Turnpike  to the east. The highway continues into the vicinity of Albany, where it connects to Troy via I-787 at exit 23 and intersects I-90 at exit 24. The latter of the two junctions is the busiest of the Thruway's exits, serving an estimated 27 million vehicles a year. At this point, I-87 leaves the Thruway to access the nearby south end of the toll-free Adirondack Northway, also known simply as the Northway, while I-90 merges in from the east to follow the Thruway toward Buffalo and then Pennsylvania.

Adirondack Northway
Off the Thruway, I-87 and I-90 overlap for a half-mile along I-90's toll-free path through the Albany area. The brief concurrency ends at exit 1 of the Adirondack Northway in Guilderland, a junction also numbered as exit 1 on I-90. I-87 turns to head north toward the Canadian border at Champlain while I-90 continues east toward downtown Albany and Rensselaer County. South of this point, the Northway feeds into a  expressway spur known locally as Fuller Road Alternate, which links I-87 and I-90 to US 20. Fuller Road Alternate is designated as New York State Route 910F (NY 910F), an unsigned reference route, by NYSDOT. In 2004, NYSDOT ceremonially designated the entire  Northway as the Adirondack Veterans Memorial Highway.

Albany and Saratoga counties
I-87 heads northeast from I-90 as a six-lane freeway with three lanes in each direction. It immediately traverses the Albany Pine Bush Preserve and passes west of Rensselaer Lake before crossing CSX Transportation's Hudson Subdivision and running parallel to Wolf Road, a business thoroughfare through the town of Colonie. Wolf Road itself begins adjacent to exit 2, a cloverleaf interchange with NY 5 (Central Avenue). Heading northbound, the ramp for exit 2E feeds directly into the intersection of NY 5 and Wolf Road, located just west of Colonie Center, one of the Capital District's largest enclosed shopping malls. I-87 continues to run alongside Wolf Road to exit 4, a modified diamond interchange serving County Route 151 (CR 151, named Albany Shaker Road) and Albany International Airport. Wolf Road ends south of the exit; however, another section begins north of the junction, carrying NY 155 away from the airport. Prior to the Northway, there was no break in Wolf Road; in essence, exit 4 was built on top of Wolf Road's intersection with Albany Shaker Road. I-87 and NY 155 meet at exit 5, with the latter routed along Watervliet Shaker Road.

After a brief stretch of housing tracts, I-87 connects to NY 2 and NY 7 at exit 6, a single-point urban interchange, in a commercialized part of Latham. While NY 7 heads east toward Troy, I-87 continues north past gradually less commercialized areas as it approaches the northern county line. The businesses ultimately give way to stretches of homes and subdivisions as the highway crosses into Saratoga County by way of the Thaddeus Kosciusko Bridge, called by locals "the twin bridges", spanning the Mohawk River. The northern portion of the Northway through Colonie and Saratoga County is now a heavily traveled commuter route as a six-lane freeway. Since the highway's construction, Saratoga County has become the fastest growing area of the Capital District, and indeed all of upstate New York.

For its first few miles in Saratoga County, I-87 runs across lightly developed parts of the towns of Halfmoon and Clifton Park. Near exit 9, however, the freeway passes through the commercial center of Clifton Park as it connects to NY 146. Clifton Park Center, one of several shopping plazas at the junction, is situated southwest of the exit. Past exit 9, the commercial development subsides as I-87 traverses another area dominated by housing tracts. Just north of the exit, the freeway passes a rest area for northbound traffic. The freeway continues on, passing to the west of the centers of Round Lake at exit 11 and Malta at exit 12. After Malta, I-87 turns slightly to the northeast and begins to loosely parallel the northwestern edge of Saratoga Lake as it crosses Kayaderasseras Creek and enters Saratoga Springs.

As the route comes close to downtown Saratoga Springs, it meets NY 9P at exit 14. The junction is adjacent to the regionally popular Saratoga Race Course and thus receives heavy traffic during the racing season. The highway continues around the eastern edge of Saratoga Springs to exit 15, where the relatively undeveloped areas east of I-87 are briefly replaced by Wilton's commercial district along NY 50. As I-87 continues northeast through Wilton, it heads across significantly less developed areas, with open fields becoming the most common feature along the road. It continues into Moreau, connecting to US 9 and serving Moreau Lake State Park by way of exit 17, a cloverleaf interchange, before crossing the Hudson River and entering Warren County.

Warren and Essex counties

Between the bridge and exit 18, I-87 passes two rest areas, one for each direction. The road's northward course quickly brings it to the outskirts of Glens Falls, and as such the highway heads across another swath of residential neighborhoods. Exits 18 and 19 are the main exits for the city, with the latter connecting to NY 254 near Aviation Mall, located on NY 254 just west of the route's junction with US 9. A northwestern turn in the freeway takes I-87 past the Great Escape amusement park and lodge, both of which are accessed from exit 20 and NY 149. Past exit 20, I-87 runs across increasingly remote areas of Queensbury as the road enters Adirondack Park and heads toward Lake George. The freeway closely follows US 9 northwest to the village of Lake George, where I-87 meets NY 9N via exits 21 and 22. Route 9N veers to the northeast along the shore of Lake George as "Lake Shore Drive", toward the town of Bolton Landing, a popular village on the shore of Lake George with shops and restaurants. Here, the Northway narrows from six to four lanes, preparing for the more rural areas and rugged terrain that follow.

North of Lake George, the Northway runs alongside US 9 to Warrensburg, a small town on the Schroon River served by exit 23. The view straight ahead on the northbound side from this interchange acts as an unofficial gateway to the Adirondacks, with tall mountains acting as a backdrop to a straight stretch of highway. While US 9 heads northwest into the Warrensburg to connect to NY 28, I-87 turns northward to follow the east bank of the Schroon River for  through a deep, remote valley. The Northway reaches exit 24 while in this valley, which once again serves the town of Bolton Landing. Exit 25 serves NY 8 at a diamond interchange. The stretch away from US 9 ends at exit 26, where I-87 reconnects to US 9 in Pottersville. At this point, I-87 makes a slight turn to the northeast to follow US 9 as the latter road runs along the western shoreline of Schroon Lake. Both roads pass a handful of lakefront properties on their way into Essex County and the town of Schroon Lake, where the lake comes to an end and NY 74 begins its eastward trek to Ticonderoga at exit 28.

In North Hudson, the valley becomes less pronounced as the Schroon River reaches its source near exit 30. Here, US 9 and I-87 cross paths again, with the former heading northwest toward Keene and the latter continuing northeast in a narrow valley formed by Ash Craft Brook. After , the stream reaches its source at Lincoln Pond, leaving the Northway to climb in elevation and wind its way northeastward across the surrounding mountains. It reaches slightly more level ground in Westport, where I-87 connects to NY 9N at exit 31. From here, the highway takes a generally northerly track across the Boquet River to the town of Lewis, rejoining US 9 as both roads head toward Clinton County. They split again after  as US 9 veers more easterly than I-87 to serve Keeseville. The Northway, meanwhile, heads to the northwest, bypassing the village to cross the Ausable River and enter Clinton County.

Clinton County
Just across the county line, I-87 intersects NY 9N again at exit 34 in Keeseville, finally leaving the more rural, mountainous areas of the Adirondack Mountains and entering a more populated region. Exit 34 is the southernmost junction to feature bilingual guide signs in English and French due to the road's proximity to Quebec. Beyond NY 9N, the Northway curves to the north, running along the west side of Keeseville before entering another rural but fairly level stretch that follows I-87 out of Adirondack Park. Now outside the park, the highway encounters more frequent pockets of development as it follows NY 22 into the town of Plattsburgh. Just inside the town line, the Northway crosses over the Salmon River and intersects NY 22 at exit 36, a junction serving nearby Plattsburgh International Airport. While NY 22 heads northeast into the city of Plattsburgh, I-87 runs north through its western suburbs, passing over the Saranac River and intersecting NY 3 at exit 37. The Northway and NY 22 meet again north of downtown at exit 38.

The section of I-87 between exits 38 and 39 crosses a marshy area surrounding Dead Creek, a stream feeding into nearby Plattsburgh Bay. Access to the bay shore is provided off to the northeast by exit 39, a modified cloverleaf interchange for NY 314. Continuing away from the junction, I-87 comes within  of Lake Champlain as it follows US 9 away from Plattsburgh and northward across open, rolling fields in the towns of Beekmantown and Chazy. Outside of the hamlet of Chazy, the Northway begins to run across a series of wetlands along the west side of US 9. The marshy terrain follows I-87 into the town of Champlain, where I-87 encounters the northernmost community along its course, the village of Champlain. I-87 veers slightly westward to avoid the village, and in doing so it meets US 11 at exit 42, a diamond interchange just west of the village limits.

I-87 takes a northerly track from US 11, crossing the Chazy River and briefly entering the village limits, where it runs past a series of homes and businesses built up along nearby US 9. As both roads head north out of the village, US 9 connects to the Northway one last time (also the northern terminus of US 9) at exit 43, the last interchange on I-87 before the Canadian border. Past the exit, the highway doubles in width, becoming eight lanes wide as it begins to run past the customs facilities on the American side of the border. The Northway and I-87 end shortly thereafter at the Canadian border, where the highway continues past the Champlain–St. Bernard de Lacolle Border Crossing into Quebec as A-15 toward Montreal.

History

Designation and early construction

The origins of the Major Deegan Expressway date back to 1936 when the Regional Plan Association concluded that in order to relieve New York City's traffic problems, a limited-access, truck-accessible expressway should be built on the west side of the Bronx. This route would connect the brand-new Triborough Bridge to the proposed New York State Thruway in Westchester County. A  section of the expressway from the bridge to the Grand Concourse was completed in April 1939. The expressway was designated as New York State Route 1B (NY 1B) ; however, the designation was removed by 1947. In 1945, public works planner Robert Moses proposed extending the highway to the proposed Thruway. Construction on the extension began in 1950, and the new route was opened in 1956. The Major Deegan Expressway is named for William Francis Deegan, who died in 1932. He was an architect, a major in the Army Corps of Engineers, and a Democratic political leader in New York City.

I-87 was assigned on August 14, 1957, as part of the establishment of the Interstate Highway System. The highway initially utilized the preexisting New York State Thruway from Albany to Newburgh and in lower Westchester County, and the Major Deegan Expressway in New York City. From Newburgh to the Elmsford area, I-87 was to follow a new highway running parallel to US 9 northward along the eastern bank of the Hudson River to Fishkill. I-87 would then have followed the proposed I-84 across the Hudson to rejoin the Thruway outside of Newburgh. After the Hudson River Expressway proposal was cancelled in the 1960s, the alignment of I-87 was shifted farther east to follow a newly completed freeway in the Route 22 corridor that started at I-287 in White Plains, then cut north through the extreme southwest corner of Connecticut before reentering New York and reaching I-84 at Brewster. I-87 then followed I-84 west to Newburgh. In 1970, the I-87 designation was shifted to the New York State Thruway between Newburgh and the Deegan Expressway; its previous alignment between Brewster and White Plains was redesignated as I-684. Meanwhile, all of the Adirondack Northway, the portion of I-87 slated to extend from Albany north to the Canadian border, had yet to be built. Fuller Road Alternate, the spur leading south from the Adirondack Northway to US 20, was originally intended to be part of the Southern Albany Expressway, a proposed highway which would have connected the Northway with I-787 and run parallel to the Thruway between exits 23 and 24.

{
  "type": "ExternalData",
  "service": "page",
  "title": "Interstate 87 (New York) Reference Routes.map"
}
The Northway was built in segments, which became I-87 as they were completed and linked to the preexisting route. Construction began in the late 1950s on the portion of the Northway between the Thruway and NY 7 near Latham. This segment was open to traffic by 1960, by which time work had begun on two additional segments from Latham to Malta (at NY 67) and from US 9 in northern Saratoga County to US 9 and NY 149 midway between Glens Falls and Lake George village. The expressway was completed between Latham and Clifton Park (NY 146) and from US 9 south of Glens Falls to the Hudson River . The US 9–NY 149 section of the highway was finished on May 26, 1961, at a total cost of $9.5 million (equivalent to $ in ). Work on the Latham–Malta segment concluded on November 22 of that year with the opening of a $6.6-million (equivalent to $ in ) piece between NY 146 and NY 67. When the Latham–Malta segment was opened, it featured one of the few railroad grade crossings on an Interstate Highway, just south of the Thaddeus Kosciusko Bridge over the Mohawk River. This at-grade crossing was removed within a couple of years when the railroad line was cut backward and the crossing was no longer needed. Construction on the portion of highway between the two segments began . The  part between NY 9P and NY 50 near Saratoga Springs was finished on July 19, 1963, and the entire NY 67–US 9 segment was completed by 1964. An extension linking NY 149 to NY 9N south of Lake George village opened in mid-1963.

By July 1963, the Northway was completed from the Canadian border south to exit 34 at Keeseville. Additionally, the existing Albany–Lake George section was extended slightly by May 1966 to serve the northern part of Lake George. At the time, I-87 curved around the western outskirts of the village to end at NY 9N north of the village on a highway built . In mid-1966, the state opened a $23-million (equivalent to $ in ) section of the Northway between Lake George and exit 26 at Pottersville. I-87 was reconfigured slightly near Lake George as a result: instead of heading east to NY 9N, it continued north on a parallel routing to US 9. The Northway's former routing to NY 9N, known infrequently today as the Lake George Connector, is now NY 912Q, an unsigned reference route  in length. NY 912Q has one intermediate interchange with US 9. On March 5, 1967, the Lake George–Pottersville portion of I-87 was chosen as America's Most Scenic New Highway of 1966 by Parade. It became the second New York highway to win the award, as a stretch of NY 17 in Broome and Delaware counties was selected for the title in 1964.

Filling the gaps
The gap in the Northway between Pottersville and Keeseville was narrowed considerably by July 1967 with the completion of a  segment from Pottersville to exit 30 at Underwood. It was closed further on July 25, 1967, with the opening of a  stretch near Keeseville between exits 34 and 33. The last section of the Northway to be built, a  stretch between Underwood and Keeseville (exit 33), was finished on August 31, 1967. The completion of the Northway linked New York City with Montreal by way of a direct, limited-access highway, with I-87 becoming A-15 at the Canadian border. The total cost to build the Adirondack Northway was $208 million (equivalent to $ in ).

Another gap in I-87 existed in downstate New York, as the plan to build I-87 along the proposed Hudson River Expressway had been scrapped by 1962. Instead, I-87 was now proposed to begin in Port Chester and follow a new routing through Purchase, Armonk, and Katonah to Brewster, where it would join I-84. The routing was modified slightly by 1968: I-87 still began in New York City, then overlapped with I-287 east to Purchase. From there, I-87 headed north along the now-open expressway to Armonk, where it ended at NY 22. Another portion of the highway, from Goldens Bridge (NY 138) to Brewster, was open as well while the part from Armonk to Katonah was under construction. This segment, as well as the part from Katonah to Goldens Bridge, was completed by 1971. On January 1, 1970, I-87 was rerouted between Elmsford and Newburgh to follow the mainline of the Thruway instead, leaving the Purchase–Brewster freeway to become I-684.

Tappan Zee Bridge replacement

 The original Tappan Zee Bridge, carrying the concurrency of New York State Thruway, I-87, and I-287, was a cantilever bridge built during 1952–55. Before its replacement in 2017, the deteriorating structure carried an average of 138,000 vehicles per day, substantially more traffic than its designed capacity. During its first decade, the bridge carried fewer than 40,000 vehicles per day. Part of the justification for replacing the bridge stems from its construction immediately following the Korean War on a low budget of only $81 million (equivalent to $ in ). Unlike other major bridges in New York metropolitan area, the Tappan Zee was designed to last only 50 years. The Federal Highway Administration (FHWA) issued a report in October 2011 designating the Tappan Zee's replacement to be a dual-span twin bridge.

Construction officially began in October 2013, with the new spans being built to the north of the existing bridge. The new bridge connects to the existing highway approaches of I-87 and I-287 on both river banks. The northbound/westbound span opened on August 25, 2017. Southbound/eastbound traffic remained on the old bridge until October 6, 2017. At that point, southbound/eastbound traffic shifted to the westbound span of the new bridge and the old bridge closed. The bridge's eastbound span opened to traffic on September 11, 2018. Upon completion, the new Tappan Zee Bridge became one of the longest cable-stayed spans in the nation.

In June 2017, the Tappan Zee Bridge was renamed the Governor Mario M. Cuomo Bridge. The renaming resulted in controversy from the public who wanted to keep the name to honor Tappan Indians and Dutch who previously resided in the area. In August 2019, some signs for the bridge were replaced because they did not include the governor's middle initial in the name.

Other developments

In the wake of former New York Yankees player Joe DiMaggio's death on March 8, 1999, Governor George Pataki proposed renaming the Deegan Expressway to the "Joe DiMaggio Highway." However, New York City Mayor Rudy Giuliani favored renaming the West Side Highway for DiMaggio instead. Pataki agreed to Giuliani's proposal one week later.

A long stretch of the Northway through the Adirondack Park had been an unserved zone for cellular telephone service. In 2007, a driver who crashed off the road was unable to summon help, prompting messages from local governments to telephone companies to add new wireless towers to address the problem and warning signs to inform travelers of the so-called "dark zone". Throughout this area, roadside emergency call boxes were located approximately every  on both sides of the roadway. These boxes used a two-way ultra high frequency radio network to connect directly to New York State Police dispatchers. In February 2023, the New York State police announced that the call box system was being decommissioned and would be removed complete by fall, 2023.  The first of 13 new cellular phone towers along I-87 was installed in October 2008. A second cellular phone tower was completed just one month later.

Exit 6 on the Adirondack Northway was originally a diamond interchange. Construction to convert the junction into a single-point urban interchange began in mid-2008 and was completed on September 12, 2010. The total cost of the project was $41.9 million (equivalent to $ in ).

Albany Airport Connector 

Until October 2019, there was no exit 3 on the Northway section of I-87, as this number was reserved for an interchange with the now-canceled I-687. A project to improve motorist access to the Albany International Airport at exit 4 took place in the late 2010s. The two old deteriorating bridges at exit 4 which had carried 102,000 vehicles a day were replaced. Once the new replacement bridges were built, the old bridges were demolished. Construction began in February 2015 and was completed on October 31, 2015.

In August 2018, plans were announced to build a new exit 3 on the Northway, providing more direct access from both directions to Albany International Airport. The project was completed by Lancaster Development and Tully Construction at a cost of $50 million, with a target completion date of mid-2020. As part of the interchange, a flyover ramp was constructed over the Northway, allowing northbound and traffic direct access to Albany Shaker Road/NY 155 near the Desmond Hotel Albany. Southbound traffic was able to both exit and enter to/from the connector.

The southbound entrance for the connector (exit 3) opened on September 27, 2019, while the southbound exit opened the next month. Traffic signals were installed at the intersection of Albany Shaker Road and the connector. The northbound exit opened in November 2019. Other changes completed as part of the project include:
 Exit 4 on I-87 northbound was changed to a right turn only onto Wolf Road.
 Exit 4 on I-87 southbound was changed to a right turn only onto Old Wolf Road.
 A new direct entrance ramp was built from exit 5 (Watervliet-Shaker Road/NY 155) to I-87 southbound.
 Turn lanes, sidewalks, and medians were added to Albany Shaker Road between the intersections with the flyover ramps and Wolf Road. A new shared use path was built along Albany Shaker Road between the intersections with the flyover ramps and Albany International Airport.
 A new noise wall along I-87 northbound was built between exits 4 and 5.

Afternoon traffic was expected to be reduced by 54 percent, and morning traffic was expected to decrease by 29 percent. During construction, the project received criticism over the fact that some of the ramps were built on sacred Indian land. Murals were supposed to be installed on the exit 3 overpass, but the murals had still not been installed after the completion of all work on exit 3 in late 2020. The murals were finally installed in early 2021.

Exit list
The mileposts below follow actual signage, even though the route is continuous. For the Bronx section of I-87, mile 0.00 is just north of the Robert F. Kennedy Bridge. For the Thruway section of I-87, mile 0.00 is at the Yonkers–Bronx city line. For the Northway section of I-87, mile 0.00 is just north of the overpass with I-90.

Auxiliary routes

The road has three current spur routes, all located along the Thruway portion of I-87. I-287 serves as a  bypass around New York City, beginning at the New Jersey Turnpike in Middlesex County, New Jersey, and ending at I-95 (the New England Thruway) near the Connecticut border in Rye. East of the concurrency, I-287 is known as the Cross-Westchester Expressway. The other two spurs, the  I-587 and the  I-787, link I-87 to the cities of Kingston and Albany, respectively.

Two other spurs of I-87 were planned but never constructed, with no plans to sign them in the near future. In the Hudson Valley, I-487 would have run along the Hudson River from I-87 and I-287 in Tarrytown to I-84 east of Beacon. The other spur, I-687, would have connected I-90 in Albany to I-87 near Albany International Airport in Colonie. Both routes were canceled in the 1970s as a result of public opposition. Part of what would have been I-487 is now the Croton Expressway, which is part of US 9, and part of what would have been I-687 is now the Albany Airport Connector, which provides direct access between the Northway (I-87) and Albany International Airport.

See also

References

External links

 Aerial photos of both ends of I-87
 Covering I-87, the Adirondack Northway from Albany to Quebec through the Adirondacks
 I-87 (Greater New York Roads)

 
87
87
087
New York State Thruway Authority
Expressways in New York City
Transportation in the Bronx
Transportation in Westchester County, New York
Transportation in Yonkers, New York
Transportation in Rockland County, New York
Transportation in Orange County, New York
Transportation in Ulster County, New York
Transportation in Greene County, New York
Transportation in Albany County, New York
Transportation in Saratoga County, New York
Transportation in Clinton County, New York
Transportation in Essex County, New York
Transportation in Warren County, New York